Michael Glover (born  September 1, 1987) is an American professional basketball player. He played college basketball for Iona. His moniker is Optimus Prime.

Glover played for three high schools. His senior-year transcript from American Christian Academy (Aston, Pennsylvania) was voided, and he was ruled ineligible for NCAA Division I play. Glover, a top prospect, decided to sue the NCAA, but a judge dismissed the lawsuit and he did not fight it since his girlfriend had just given birth to a son, Mike Jr. Glover played for two different community colleges—ASA College in Brooklyn and the College of Eastern Utah. Glover enrolled at Iona, where, as a senior, he posted averages of 18.1 points and 9.1 rebounds per game. He was a first-team all-Metro Atlantic Athletic Conference selection both years at Iona.

In 2015, Glover signed with the Halifax Hurricanes of the National Basketball League of Canada (NBL).

In July 2016, Glover was signed by the GlobalPort Batang Pier of the Philippine Basketball Association for the Governors' Cup as a replacement for Dominique Sutton.

References

External links
Profile at RealGM.com
Profile at Latinbasket.com

1987 births
Living people
American expatriate basketball people in Argentina
American expatriate basketball people in Canada
American expatriate basketball people in Chile
American expatriate basketball people in Mexico
American expatriate basketball people in the Philippines
American expatriate basketball people in Turkey
Basketball players from New York City
American men's basketball players
Estudiantes Concordia basketball players
Hacettepe Üniversitesi B.K. players
Halcones de Ciudad Obregón players
Halcones de Xalapa players
Halifax Hurricanes players
Iona Gaels men's basketball players
Junior college men's basketball players in the United States
NorthPort Batang Pier players
Panteras de Aguascalientes players
Philippine Basketball Association imports
Power forwards (basketball)
Sportspeople from the Bronx
TNT Tropang Giga players
Utah State Eastern Golden Eagles men's basketball players
Cape Breton Highlanders (basketball) players
American expatriate basketball people in Indonesia
American expatriate basketball people in the Dominican Republic